On 31 May 1926, the first Lebanese government was formed which was headed by Auguste Adib Pacha. It won the confidence of both the parliament and the senate in 14 June, with a majority of 26 votes. On 29 April 1927, 12 members of the senate signed a petition asking to withdrawal of the confidence, so the prime minister followed and resigned on 2 May.

Composition
The cabinet members were as follows:

References

Cabinets established in 1926
Cabinets disestablished in 1927
Cabinets of Lebanon
1926 establishments in Lebanon
1927 disestablishments in Lebanon